Aaron of Auxerre (fl. ~ 800) was a bishop of Auxerre (perhaps 794-807). He has been beatified by the Roman Catholic Church, and his relics are venerated in the Church of Saint-Germain in Auxerre, where his feast day is celebrated on 28 September.

He is included in the roster of saints in the book Les Petits Bollandistes.

References

Sources
Holweck, F. G., A Biographical Dictionary of the Saints. St. Louis, Mo.: B. Herder Book Co. 1924.

Year of birth unknown
Date of death unknown
French beatified people
Bishops of Auxerre
800s deaths
9th-century French bishops